Schönbach may refer to:

People 

 Kay-Achim Schönbach, German vice-admiral

Places 
 Schönbach, Austria, in Lower Austria
 Schönbach, Saxony, in the district Löbau-Zittau, Saxony, Germany
 Schönbach, Sebnitz, a former municipality in Saxony, now part of the town Sebnitz, Germany
 Schönbach, Rhineland-Palatinate, in the district Vulkaneifel, Rhineland-Palatinate, Germany
 Schönbach, the German name for Meziboří, in Ústí nad Labem Region, Czech Republic
 Schönbach, the German name for Luby (Cheb District), Czech Republic
 Schönbach bei Asch, the German name for Krásná (Cheb District), Czech Republic
 Schönbach, the German name for Zdislava (Liberec District), Liberec District, Czech Republic
 Schönbach (river), a river of Baden-Württemberg, Germany, tributary of the Elta